The status of territories captured by Israel is the status of the Gaza Strip, the West Bank, the Golan Heights, and the Sinai Peninsula; all of which were captured by Israel over the course of the 1967 Six-Day War.

The Sinai peninsula status was returned to full sovereignty of Egypt in 1982 as a result of the Egypt–Israel peace treaty. The United Nations Security Council and the International Court of Justice both describe the West Bank and Western Golan Heights as "occupied territory" under international law, and the Supreme Court of Israel describes them as held "in belligerent occupation", however Israel's government calls the West Bank "disputed" rather than "occupied" and argues that since Israel's unilateral disengagement plan of 2005, it does not militarily occupy the Gaza strip, a statement rejected by the United Nations Human Rights Council and Human Rights Watch because Israel continues to maintain control of its airspace, waters, and borders.

Terminology

"Occupied territories"

In their decisions on the Israeli West Bank barrier, the International Court of Justice and Supreme Court of Israel have both ruled that the West Bank is occupied. The US State Department also considers the West Bank and Gaza Strip occupied.

The ICJ outlined the legal rationale for the supporters of this view in its advisory opinion of 9 July 2004. It noted:
...under customary international law as reflected (...) in Article 42 of the Regulations Respecting the Laws and Customs of War on Land annexed to the Fourth Hague Convention of 18 October 1907 (hereinafter “the Hague Regulations of 1907”), territory is considered occupied when it is actually placed under the authority of the hostile army, and the occupation extends only to the territory where such authority has been established and can be exercised. The territories situated between the Green Line (see paragraph 72 above) and the former eastern boundary of Palestine under the Mandate were occupied by Israel in 1967 during the armed conflict between Israel and Jordan.  Under customary international law, these were therefore occupied territories in which Israel had the status of occupying Power.  Subsequent events in these territories, as described in paragraphs 75 to 77 above, have done nothing to alter this situation.  All these territories (including East Jerusalem) remain occupied territories and Israel has continued to have the status of occupying Power.

On the application of the fourth Geneva Convention, the Court noted:
...for the purpose of determining the scope of application of the Fourth Geneva 
Convention, it should be recalled that under common Article 2 of the four Conventions of 12 August 1949:“In addition to the provisions which shall be implemented in peacetime, the present Convention shall apply to all cases of declared war or of any other armed conflict which may arise between two or more of the High Contracting Parties, even if the state of war is not recognized by one of them.          
The Convention shall also apply to all cases of partial or total occupation of the territory of a High Contracting Party, even if the said occupation meets with no armed resistance."(...)
the Court notes that, according to the first paragraph of Article 2 of the Fourth Geneva 
Convention, that Convention is applicable when two conditions are fulfilled:  that there exists an 
armed conflict (whether or not a state of war has been recognized);  and that the conflict has arisen 
between two contracting parties. (...) The object of the second paragraph of Article 2 is not to restrict the scope of application of the Convention, as defined by the first paragraph, by excluding therefrom territories not falling under the sovereignty of one of the contracting parties.  It is directed simply to making it clear that, even if occupation effected during the conflict met no armed resistance, the Convention is still applicable.

In its June 2005 ruling upholding the constitutionality of the Gaza disengagement, the Israeli High Court determined that "Judea and Samaria [West Bank] and the Gaza area are lands seized during warfare, and are not part of Israel."

"Disputed territories"
The Jerusalem Center for Public Affairs and Israeli government websites who support the view that the territories are not occupied argue that use of the term "occupied" in relation to Israel's control of the areas has no basis in international law or history, and that it prejudges the outcome of negotiations. They regard the territories as "disputed" based on the following legal arguments:
 No borders have been established or recognized by the parties. Armistice lines do not establish borders, and the 1949 Armistice Agreements in particular specifically stated (at Arab insistence) that they were not creating permanent or de jure borders.
In line with the above idea, the Israeli government has officially stated that its position is that the territories cannot be called occupied, as no nation had clear rights to them, and there was no operative diplomatic arrangement, when Israel acquired them in June 1967.
 Territories are only "occupied" if they are captured in war from an established and recognized sovereign, but no state had a legitimate or recognized sovereignty over the West Bank (Jordan’s annexation of the West Bank was only recognized by two countries), Gaza Strip or East Jerusalem prior to the Six-Day War.
 The Fourth Geneva Convention is not applicable to the West Bank and Gaza Strip, since, under its Article 2, it pertains only to "cases of…occupation of the territory of a High Contracting Party" by another High Contracting party. The West Bank and Gaza Strip have never been the legal territories of any High Contracting Party.
 Even if the Fourth Geneva Convention had applied at one point, they certainly did not apply once the Israel transferred governmental powers to the Palestinian Authority in accordance with the 1993 Oslo Accords, since Article 6 of the convention states that the Occupying Power would only be bound to its terms "to the extent that such Power exercises the functions of government in such territory....".
Israel took control of the West Bank as a result of a defensive war. The language of "occupation" has allowed Palestinian spokesmen to obfuscate this history. By repeatedly pointing to "occupation," they manage to reverse the causality of the conflict, especially in front of Western audiences. Thus, the current territorial dispute is allegedly the result of an Israeli decision "to occupy," rather than a result of a war imposed on Israel by a coalition of Arab states in 1967. Former State Department Legal Advisor Stephen Schwebel, who later headed the International Court of Justice in the Hague, wrote in 1970 regarding Israel's case: "Where the prior holder of territory had seized that territory unlawfully, the state which subsequently takes that territory in the lawful exercise of self-defense has, against that prior holder, better title."

Yoram Dinstein has dismissed the position that they are not occupied as being “based on dubious legal grounds”. Many Israeli government websites do refer to the areas as being "occupied territories".

After 1967, a number of legal arguments were advanced which dismissed the right of Palestinians to self-determination and statehood. They generally proposed that Palestine was a land void of a legitimate sovereign and supported Israeli claims to the remaining territory of the Palestine Mandate. Historian and journalist, Gershom Gorenberg, says that outside of the pro-settlement community in Israel, these positions are considered quirky. He says that, while the Israeli government has used them for public relations purposes abroad, it takes entirely different positions when arguing real legal cases before the Israeli Supreme Court. In 2005 Israel decided to dismantle all Israeli settlements in the Gaza Strip and four in the northern West Bank. Gorenberg notes, the government's decision was challenged in the Supreme Court by settlers, and the government won the case by noting the settlements were in territory whose legal status was that of 'belligerent territory'. The government argued that the settlers should have known the settlements were only temporary.

Territories by current status

Gaza Strip

Following the 1967 war, in which the Israeli army occupied the West Bank and Gaza Strip, a military administration over the Palestinian population was put in place. In 1993, Israel gave autonomy to the people of Gaza and completely disengaged from Gaza in 2005. However, in 2007, Israel put a blockade on the Gaza Strip over what it viewed as security concerns. Israel asserts that since the disengagement of Israel from Gaza in 2005, Israel no longer occupies the Gaza Strip. As Israel retained  control of Gaza's airspace and coastline,  it continued to be designated as an occupying power in the Gaza Strip by the United Nations Security Council, the United Nations General Assembly and some countries and various human rights organizations.

Golan Heights

The Golan was under military administration until the Knesset passed the Golan Heights Law in 1981, which applied Israeli law to the territory; a move that has been described as an annexation. In response, the United Nations Security Council unanimously passed UNSC Resolution 497 which condemned the Israeli actions to change the status of the territory declaring them "null and void and without international legal effect", and that the Golan remained an occupied territory. In 2019, the United States became the only state to recognize the Golan Heights as Israeli sovereign territory, while the rest of the international community continues to consider the territory Syrian held under Israeli military occupation.

West Bank

While the international community considers the West Bank to be a territory held by Israel under military occupation. Judea and Samaria Area is the Israeli government term for the district encompassing Israeli administratively controlled Jewish-majority civilian areas of Area C of the West Bank, excluding East Jerusalem. It is for some purposes regarded by Israeli authorities as one of its administrative regions,

East Jerusalem

East Jerusalem had been occupied by Israel in 1967 and was effectively annexed by Israel in 1980, an act internationally condemned. On 27–28 June 1967, East Jerusalem was integrated into Jerusalem by extension of its municipal borders and was placed under the law, jurisdiction and administration of the State of Israel. In a unanimous General Assembly resolution, the UN declared the measures trying to change the status of the city invalid.

Non-member observer state status of Palestine

On Thursday, November 29, 2012, In a 138-9 vote (with 41 abstaining) General Assembly resolution 67/19 passed, upgrading Palestine to "non-member observer state" status in the United Nations. The new status equates Palestine's with that of the Holy See. The change in status was described by The Independent as "de facto recognition of the sovereign State of Palestine". Voting "no" were Canada, the Czech Republic, Israel, the Marshall Islands, Micronesia, Nauru, Palau, Panama and the United States.

The vote was a historic benchmark for the partially recognised State of Palestine and its citizens, whilst it was a diplomatic setback for Israel and the United States. Status as an observer state in the UN will allow the State of Palestine to join treaties and specialised UN agencies. the Law of the Seas treaty, and the International Criminal Court. It shall permit Palestine to pursue legal rights over its territorial waters and air space as a sovereign state recognised by the UN, and allow the Palestinian people the right to sue for sovereignty over their rightful territory in the International Court of Justice and to bring 'crimes against humanity' and war-crimes charges, including that of unlawfully occupying the territory of State of Palestine, against Israel in the International Criminal Court.

The UN has, after the resolution was passed, permitted Palestine to title its representative office to the UN as "The Permanent Observer Mission of the State of Palestine to the United Nations", seen by many as a reflexion of  the UN's de facto position of recognising the State of Palestine's sovereignty under international law, and Palestine has started to re-title its name accordingly on postal stamps, official documents and passports. The Palestinian authorities have also instructed its diplomats to officially represent the "State of Palestine", as opposed to the "Palestine National Authority". Additionally, on 17 December 2012, UN Chief of Protocol Yeocheol Yoon decided that "the designation of "State of Palestine" shall be used by the Secretariat in all official United Nations documents", recognising the "State of Palestine" as an independent nation.

Israeli judicial decisions
In two cases decided shortly after independence, in the Shimshon and Stampfer cases, the Supreme Court of Israel held that the fundamental rules of international law accepted as binding by all "civilized" nations were incorporated in the domestic legal system of Israel. The Nuremberg Military Tribunal determined that the articles annexed to the Hague IV Convention of 1907 were customary law that had been recognized by all civilized nations. In the past, the Supreme Court has argued that the Geneva Convention insofar it is not supported by domestic legislation  "does not bind this Court, its enforcement being a matter for the states which are parties to the Convention". They ruled that "Conventional international law does not become part of Israeli law through automatic incorporation, but only if it is adopted or combined with Israeli law by enactment of primary or subsidiary legislation from which it derives its force". However, in the same decision the Court ruled that the Fourth Hague Convention rules governing belligerent occupation did apply, since those were recognized as customary international law.

The Israeli High Court of Justice determined in the 1979 Elon Moreh case that the area in question was under occupation and that accordingly only the military commander of the area may requisition land according to Article 52 of the Regulations annexed to the Hague IV Convention. Military necessity had been an after-thought in planning portions of the Elon Moreh settlement. That situation did not fulfill the precise strictures laid down in the articles of the Hague Convention, so the Court ruled the requisition order had been invalid and illegal. In recent decades, the government of Israel has argued before the Supreme Court of Israel that its authority in the territories is based on the international law of "belligerent occupation", in particular the Hague Conventions. The court has confirmed this interpretation many times, for example in its 2004 and 2005 rulings on the separation fence.

In its June 2005 ruling upholding the constitutionality of the Gaza disengagement, the Court determined that "Judea and Samaria" [West Bank] and the Gaza area are lands seized during warfare, and are not part of Israel:The Judea and Samaria areas are held by the State of Israel in belligerent occupation. The long arm of the state in the area is the military commander. He is not the sovereign in the territory held in belligerent occupation (see The Beit Sourik Case, at p. 832). His power is granted him by public international law regarding belligerent occupation. The legal meaning of this view is twofold: first, Israeli law does not apply in these areas. They have not been "annexed" to Israel. Second, the legal regime which applies in these areas is determined by public international law regarding belligerent occupation (see HCJ 1661/05 The Gaza Coast Regional Council v. The Knesset et al. (yet unpublished, paragraph 3 of the opinion of the Court; hereinafter – The Gaza Coast Regional Council Case). In the center of this public international law stand the Regulations Concerning the Laws and Customs of War on Land, The Hague, 18 October 1907 (hereinafter – The Hague Regulations). These regulations are a reflection of customary international law. The law of belligerent occupation is also laid out in IV Geneva Convention Relative to the Protection of Civilian Persons in Time of War 1949 (hereinafter – the Fourth Geneva Convention).Chronological Review of Events/June 2005

Range of Israeli legal and political views
Soon after the 1967 war, Israel issued a military order stating that the Geneva Conventions applied to the recently occupied territories, but this order was rescinded a few months later. For a number of years, Israel argued on various grounds that the Geneva Conventions do not apply.  One is the Missing Reversioner theory which argued that the Geneva Conventions apply only to the sovereign territory of a High Contracting Party, and therefore do not apply since Jordan never exercised sovereignty over the region. However, that interpretation is not shared by the international community. The application of Geneva Convention to Occupied Palestinian Territories was further upheld by International Court of Justice, UN General Assembly, UN Security Council and the Israeli Supreme Court.

In cases before the Israeli High Court of Justice the government itself has agreed that the military commander’s authority is anchored in the Fourth Geneva Convention Relative to the Protection of Civilian Persons in Time of War, and that the humanitarian rules of the Fourth Geneva Convention apply. The Israeli MFA says that the Supreme Court of Israel has ruled that the Fourth Geneva Convention and certain parts of Additional Protocol I reflect customary international law that is applicable in the occupied territories. Gershom Gorenberg has written that the Israeli government knew at the outset that it was violating the Geneva Convention by creating civilian settlements in the territories under IDF administration. He explained that as the legal counsel of the Foreign Ministry, Theodor Meron was the Israeli government's expert on international law. On September 16, 1967 Meron wrote a top secret memo to Mr. Adi Yafeh, Political Secretary of the Prime Minister regarding "Settlement in the Administered Territories" which said "My conclusion is that civilian settlement in the Administered territories contravenes the explicit provisions of the Fourth Geneva Convention." Moshe Dayan authored a secret memo in 1968 proposing massive settlement in the territories which said “Settling Israelis in administered territory, as is known, contravenes international conventions, but there is nothing essentially new about that.”

The commission of experts headed by the retired Israeli Supreme Court Judge Edmond Levy issued on July 9, 2012 its report on the status of the territories conquered by Israel in 1967. The commission concluded that the Israeli control over those territories is not an occupation in the legal sense, and that the Israeli settlements in those territories do not contravene international law.

See also
 International law and the Arab–Israeli conflict
 International law and Israeli settlements
 Regulation Law
 West Bank Areas in the Oslo II Accord

Notes
  Disputed Territories: Forgotten Facts About the West Bank and Gaza Strip, Israeli Ministry of Foreign Affairs website, February 1, 2003. Retrieved September 28, 2005.
  International Law and the Arab-Israeli Conflict Extracts from "Israel and Palestine - Assault on the Law of Nations" by Julius Stone, Ed: Ian Lacey, Second edition, Australia/Israel & Jewish Affairs Council website, 2003. Retrieved September 29, 2005.
  Inaccurate Terms in Coverage of Bush Statement, Committee for Accuracy in Middle East Reporting in America website, April 18, 2004. Retrieved September 29, 2005.
  Jewish Settlements and the Media, Committee for Accuracy in Middle East Reporting in America website, October 5, 2001. Retrieved February 5, 2006.
  "Occupied Territories" to "Disputed Territories" by Dore Gold, Jerusalem Center for Public Affairs, January 16, 2002. Retrieved September 29, 2005.
  Forgotten Facts About the West Bank and Gaza Strip, Israeli Ministry of Foreign Affairs website, February 1, 2003. Retrieved September 28, 2005.

References

Israeli-occupied territories
Israeli–Palestinian conflict
Disputed territories in Asia